Harold Burnell Carter, BVSc, DVSc (Hon), FRSE, AM; (3 January 1910 – 27 February 2005) was an Australian scientist whose work in the middle decades of the twentieth century at the CSIR (now CSIRO)  Australia's national scientific research organization  laid foundations for the scientific understanding of the biology of Merino fine wool  upon which much of Australia's economy depended at the time.  As an author, he has been collected by libraries.

Research
Carter's investigations were focussed upon the histology of the wool fibre, its embryonic development and the genetic and environmental factors that caused variability in wool quality.  His aim was to establish the necessary scientific knowledge by which the economic value of the Merino could be improved.  Through this work he conceived the idea of an Australian national Sheep and Wool laboratory.  In the early 1940s he drafted a plan for such laboratories which he developed in discussion with his senior colleagues Lionel B. Bull and Ian Clunies Ross. In 1945, as part of Australia's post War economic development plan, an Act of the Australian Parliament was passed for their construction (Wool Uses Promotion Act, 1945).  The laboratories, built at Prospect Hill near Sydney under Carter's supervision, were opened in 1953 as the "Sheep Biology Laboratory" of the CSIRO (renamed the "Ian Clunies Ross Animal Research Laboratory" in 1959 following the death of Clunies Ross, the Director of CSIRO).

Following completion of the Sheep Biology Laboratory Carter resigned from the CSIRO and took a position at the Animal Breeding Research Organisation in Edinburgh, Scotland. 

In the later decades of his life he devoted himself increasingly to primary historical scientific research on the origins of the Merino as a producer of fine wool. This work culminated in a major biography of Sir Joseph Banks, a founder of Australia's Merino fine wool economy.

Honours
 Fellow of the Royal Society of Edinburgh (1960)
 Honorary Degree of Doctor of Veterinary Science, University of Sydney (1996)
 Member of the Order of Australia (1999)

Major publications
 H.B. Carter "The Development and General Histology of the Follicle Group in the skin of the Merino" C.S.I.R. (Australia) Bulletin No. 164, 1-21, 1943
 H.B. Carter "His Majesty’s Spanish Flock" Angus & Robertson Ltd, 1964
 H.B. Carter "Sir Joseph Banks, 1743-1820" British Museum (Natural History), 1988

Bibliography
 R. Carter "A review of the life, work and influences of Harold Burnell Carter, August 2013" Files of the Royal Society of Edinburgh
 H.B. Carter "Notes on the Development of Sheep and Wool Research in Australia 1934-1954" Files of the Royal Society of Edinburgh
 Brad Collis "Fields of Discovery: Australia’s CSIRO" (CSIRO Publishing) 2002
 Charles Massy "The Australian Merino" (Random House) 2007
 "Wool Uses Promotion Act" Parliament of the Commonwealth of Australia, 1945
 Marjory Collar O’Dea "Ian Clunies Ross a biography" (Hyland House, Melbourne) 1997

References

Fellows of the Royal Society of Edinburgh
Australian scientists
Australian biographers
1910 births
2005 deaths
Members of the Order of Australia